Shaun Earl King (born May 29, 1977) is an American football coach and former quarterback. King was the running backs coach at South Florida. King is now a afternoon co host on the Las Vegas sports wagering channel, VSiN. He played college football at Tulane. King was drafted in the second round of the 1999 NFL draft by the Tampa Bay Buccaneers. He was also a member of the Arizona Cardinals, Indianapolis Colts, and Detroit Lions of the National Football League (NFL), as well as the Las Vegas Gladiators of the Arena Football League (AFL), and Hamilton Tiger-Cats of the Canadian Football League (CFL).

College career
After graduating from Gibbs High School in 1995, King played college football at Tulane University from 1995 to 1998, leading Tulane to an undefeated season and a win over Brigham Young University in the Liberty Bowl, in the process setting the single-season NCAA Division I-A record for passing efficiency in 1998 of 183.3. In the same year he became the first player in NCAA history to both pass for 300 yards and rush for 100 yards in the same game against Army on November 14. His quarterback coach was Rich Rodriguez and his head coach was Tommy Bowden. He finished 10th in voting for the 1998 Heisman Trophy. King is a member of Kappa Alpha Psi fraternity. King co-captained the 1998 12-0 Green Wave along with right tackle Dennis O'Sullivan. The style of offense that King ran at Tulane under Bowden was the Spread offense which is now a very popular style in NCAA football.

College Football Statistics
 1997: 199/363 (54.8%) for 2577 yards and 24 TD vs. 14 INT. 124 carries for 511 yards and 5 TD.
 1998: 244/364 (67.0%) for 3495 yards and 38 TD vs. 6 INT. 156 carries for 633 yards and 11 TD.

Professional career

Tampa Bay Buccaneers
King subsequently was drafted in the second round of the 1999 NFL Draft by the Tampa Bay Buccaneers, his hometown team. Near the midpoint of the 1999 season, quarterback Trent Dilfer suffered a season-ending injury, thrusting King into the starting quarterback role.

King took over the offense, and helped rally the team to the NFC Central title, and a victory over the Redskins in the divisional playoffs. A week later, the team fell just short of Super Bowl XXXIV when they lost the NFC Championship 11-6 to the St. Louis Rams with King at the helm.

King's best professional season was in 2000, when he started all sixteen regular-season games for the Buccaneers. A thrilling rematch against the Rams on Monday Night Football proved to be one of King's most memorable games. Trailing 35-31 with 1:21 remaining, Tampa Bay faced a 4th and 4 at the 29-yard line. King was tripped up, but scrambled 6 yards for a first down. Four plays later, Tampa Bay scored the game-winning touchdown, the seventh lead change of the game, and clinched a playoff berth. A win in week 17 would clinch a second consecutive division title and a first-round bye in the playoffs, potentially propelling Tampa Bay to their first Super Bowl appearance.  King did his part leading the offense into position for a game-winning field goal at the end of regulation. However, the usually reliable Martín Gramática missed the kick. The Buccaneers fell in overtime to the Green Bay Packers, and ultimately lost to the Eagles in the wild card round.  King did have an extremely productive season for a young QB leading his team to a 10-6 record and throwing for 18 tds (with only 13ints) and rushing for 5 more.

After the disappointing end to the 2000 NFL season, King was replaced by Brad Johnson for 2001 and relegated to a backup role for the following three seasons. In the 2002 season, Brad Johnson was injured and missed a game against the Carolina Panthers. Rob Johnson started at quarterback, but struggled to lead the offense, which managed to tie the game at 9-9 late in the fourth quarter. After a hard hit, Rob Johnson had to sit out a play on the final drive, prompting a cold-off-the-bench Shaun King to run in suddenly and throw an unexpected and decisive first down. A few plays later, Martín Gramática scored the game winning field goal.

A few weeks later, starter Brad Johnson was injured once again, and King was placed as the starter against the Pittsburgh Steelers on Monday Night Football. After some fanfare, King had a dismal first half, falling behind 14-0 after two quick turnovers. King was benched, and Rob Johnson salvaged a 17-7 loss. King would not play another down for the Buccaneers that season, as they advanced to the postseason. He suited up as the #3 quarterback for Tampa Bay's victory in Super Bowl XXXVII, but did not play in the game. King returned as the backup quarterback in 2003, but only appeared in three games, starting none. His final game as a Buccaneer was in the final week against the Titans. The Buccaneers, already eliminated from playoff contention, had fallen behind early, and King took over in the second half to wind up the disappointing season.

After Tampa Bay
In 2004, King signed with the Arizona Cardinals as a free agent, he started only two games and was released at the end of the season.  In his first start against the Carolina Panthers he threw for 343 yards which was a season high for the Cardinals.

King signed a free agent contract with the Detroit Lions in spring 2006, but asked to be released after the Lions signed Josh McCown and Jon Kitna. On Friday June 2, 2006, he signed a free agent contract with the Indianapolis Colts, but was then released as a free agent on September 3.

On Friday November 29, 2006, King signed with the Las Vegas Gladiators of the Arena Football League. He threw 10 touchdowns against the Grand Rapids Rampage on March 8, 2007, but was released by the team after a 1-5 start on April 10 of the same year.

On May 30, 2007, King signed with the Hamilton Tiger-Cats of the Canadian Football League. King was released eighteen days later, so he could pursue a career in broadcasting.

Post-playing
The Shaun King Foundation, headquartered in Winter Haven, Florida, is the principal supporter for the Kings Kids program in partnership with Boys & Girls Clubs of the Suncoast, St. Petersburg, Florida

King has worked as an NFL and college football analyst for NBC Sports and Yahoo. In July 2008, King, working as an ESPN analyst, commented that it was "outside of normal" that recently released African-American NFL quarterbacks like Daunte Culpepper, Aaron Brooks, Byron Leftwich and himself were not signed to new teams.

He is married and has two daughters and a son with his wife, Faith King.

In 2016, King joined the coaching staff of the South Florida Bulls a member of the American Athletic Conference.  In 2016 as quarterback coach, he helped Quinton Flowers to his best season and AAC player of the year recognition.  In 2017, Charlie Strong arrived and King was moved to coach the running backs at USF.
where he helped D'Ernest Johnson to his best collegiate season.  247 Sports 
named King as Recruiter of the Year.

In 2021, he started to work as a host for VSiN, in Las Vegas, Nevada. He co-hosts the show, "The Night Cap," with Tim Murray weeknights from 10 pm to 1 am ET.

See also
 List of NCAA major college football yearly passing leaders
List of Arena Football League and National Football League players

References

External links
 ESPN.com stats
 AFL stats from arenafan.com

1977 births
Living people
American football quarterbacks
Arizona Cardinals players
Detroit Lions players
Indianapolis Colts players
Hamilton Tiger-Cats players
Las Vegas Gladiators players
Tampa Bay Buccaneers players
Tulane Green Wave football players
African-American sports announcers
African-American sports journalists
Arena football announcers
College football announcers
National Football League announcers
Players of American football from St. Petersburg, Florida
Players of Canadian football from St. Petersburg, Florida
African-American players of American football
South Florida Bulls football coaches
21st-century African-American sportspeople
20th-century African-American sportspeople